Saša Blagojević (Serbian Cyrillic: Саша Благојевић; born 1 February 1989) is a Serbian football defender who plays for FK Slovan Duslo Šaľa.

Career
Blagojević began playing football in FK Partizan's youth system before playing professionally with Smederevo.

Blagojević represented Serbia and Montenegro in the 2006 UEFA European Under-17 Championship. He also played for Serbia at the under-20 level.

References

External links
 

1989 births
Living people
Sportspeople from Smederevo
Serbian footballers
FK Jagodina players
FK Smederevo players
FK Slovan Duslo Šaľa players
2. Liga (Slovakia) players
Serbian SuperLiga players
Expatriate footballers in Slovakia
Expatriate footballers in Switzerland
Expatriate footballers in Kuwait
Serbian expatriate sportspeople in Kuwait
Serbian expatriate sportspeople in Switzerland
Serbian expatriate sportspeople in Slovakia
Association football defenders
Kazma SC players
Kuwait Premier League players